Tando Thoro is a suburb of Hyderabad, Sindh, Pakistan, formerly a village nearby.

References

Neighbourhoods of Hyderabad, Sindh